Harold A. (Barney) Goltz (August 13, 1924 – December 25, 2008) was an American politician in the state of Washington.  Goltz attended Macalester College in St. Paul, Minnesota and graduated in 1945. While at Macalester, he worked on the campaign of his professor, Hubert Humphrey for Mayor of Minneapolis. He went on to get a master's degree in student affairs at the University of Minnesota.

Goltz moved to Washington state in 1957. He held several positions at Western Washington University including Director of Student Activities, Assistant to the President and Director of Planning. He served in the Washington House of Representatives from 1973 to 1975 for district 42, and in the Senate from 1975 to 1987. Goltz became president pro tem of the Senate before retiring.

References

2008 deaths
1924 births
People from Lyon County, Minnesota
Democratic Party Washington (state) state senators
Democratic Party members of the Washington House of Representatives
20th-century American politicians